"Trackin'" is a song by Filipino-American singer Billy Crawford. It was the first single released from his second studio album, Ride (2002). The song reached number one in the Netherlands, number three in Switzerland, number five in France, and number 20 in Germany. As of August 2014, it was the 74th-best-selling single of the 21st century in France, with 343,000 units sold. In the United Kingdom, the song was released as the third single in August 2003. "Trackin'" is his highest charting single there, reaching number 32 on the UK Singles Chart.

Track listings
European CD single
 "Trackin'" (album version) – 4:10
 "Trackin'" (extended mix) – 7:15
 An enhanced version featuring the "Trackin'" video was also released.

European maxi-CD single
 "Trackin'" (album version) – 4:10
 "Changing My Color" – 4:09
 "Trust Me" – 3:54
 "Trackin'" (extended mix) – 7:15

European 12-inch single
A. "Trackin'" (extended mix) – 7:15
B. "Trackin'" (album version) – 4:10

UK CD1
 "Trackin'" (radio edit) – 3:31
 "That's the Way Love Is" (radio edit) – 4:16
 "When You're in Love with Someone" (radio edit) – 4:26

UK CD2
 "Trackin'" (Wookie remix) – 4:21
 "Trackin'" (DND full vocal edit) – 5:36
 "Trackin'" (Almighty radio edit) – 3:44
 "Trackin'" (video edit) – 3:49
 "Trackin'" (video—new version) – 3:53

UK DVD single
 "Trackin'" (radio edit audio) – 3:31
 "The Making of Trackin'" (video) – 5:30

Credits
 Backing vocals by Adam Anders and Jany Schella
 Bass by Anders Barrén
 Guitar by Anders Barrén
 Mixed by Tony Maserati
 Produced by Anders Barrén and Jany Schella, Stargate

Charts

Weekly charts

Year-end charts

Certifications

Release history

References

2001 songs
2001 singles
Billy Crawford songs
Number-one singles in the Netherlands
Dutch Top 40 number-one singles
Songs written by Adam Anders
V2 Records singles